Blennidus jelskii is a species of ground beetle in the subfamily Pterostichinae. It was described by Tschitscherine in 1897.

References 

Blennidus
Beetles described in 1897